Colombia competed at the 1984 Summer Olympics in Los Angeles, United States. 39 competitors, 36 men and 3 women, took part in 34 events in 8 sports.

Medalists

Archery

In its first Olympic archery competition, Colombia was represented by one man.

Men's Individual Competition:
 Juan Echavarria - 2379 points (→ 41st place)

Athletics

Men's 400 metres 
 Manuel Ramirez-Caicedo
 Heat — 47.17 (→ did not advance)

Men's 10,000 metres
 Domingo Tibaduiza
 Qualifying Heat — 29:07.19 (→ did not advance)

Men's Marathon
 Domingo Tibaduiza — did not finish (→ no ranking)

Men's 20 km Walk
 Querubín Moreno
 Final — 1:26:04 (→ 9th place)
 Héctor Moreno
 Final — 1:27:12 (→ 12th place)
 Francisco Vargas
 Final — 1:28:46 (→ 18th place)

Men's 50 km Walk
 Querubín Moreno
 Final — DNF (→ no ranking)

Boxing

Men's Light Flyweight (– 48 kg)
 Francisco Tejedor
 First Round — Bye
 Second Round — Lost to Mamoru Kuroiwa (JPN), 1:4

Men's Bantamweight (– 54 kg)
 Robinson Pitalua
 First Round — Bye
 Second Round — Defeated Hugh Dyer (BEL), RSC-2
 Third Round — Defeated Babar Ali Khan (PAK), 5:0
 Quarter Finals — Lost to Maurizio Stecca (ITA), 0:5

Cycling

Seven cyclists represented Colombia in 1984.

Individual road race
 Néstor Mora — 8th place
 Fabio Parra — 21st place
 Carlos Jaramillo — 52nd place
 Rogelio Arango — did not finish (→ no ranking)

Sprint
 Hugo Daya

Individual pursuit
 William Palacio
 Balbino Jaramillo

Points race
 Balbino Jaramillo
 William Palacio

Shooting

Swimming

Men's 100m Breaststroke
Pablo Restrepo
 Heat — 1:04.44
 B-Final — 1:04.79 (→ 12th place)

Men's 200m Breaststroke
Pablo Restrepo
 Heat — 2:19.77
 Final — 2:18.96 (→ 6th place)

Men's 200m Individual Medley
Pablo Restrepo
 Heat — 2:08.12
 B-Final — 2:08.35 (→ 15th place)

Weightlifting

Wrestling

See also
Sports in Colombia

References

External links
Official Olympic Reports
International Olympic Committee results database

Nations at the 1984 Summer Olympics
1984
Olympics